Amphora veneta is a species of diatom belonging to the family Catenulaceae.

References

Thalassiophysales